Liz Couch (born 11 October 1974) is a New Zealand skeleton racer who competed from 1999 to 2002. She finished 11th in the women's skeleton event at the 2002 Winter Olympics in Salt Lake City.

Couch's best finish at the FIBT World Championships was 15th in the women's skeleton event at Igls in 2000.

References
2002 women's skeleton results
Skeletonsport.com profile

1974 births
Living people
New Zealand female skeleton racers
Skeleton racers at the 2002 Winter Olympics
Olympic skeleton racers of New Zealand